Sudharmono (EVO: Soedharmono; 12 March 1927 – 25 January 2006), also known by his nickname, Pak Dar, was an Indonesian politician and army officer, who served as the 5th Vice President of Indonesia, under the New Order regime of president Suharto, serving from 1988 until 1993. Previously, he served in a number of positions in the government and military, including as the Chairman of Golkar,  State Secretary of Indonesia, and a Lieutenant General in the army.

Sudharmono was born on 12 March 1927, in Gresik, East Java. He completed his Middle School education in 1945. Following the Proclamation of Indonesian Independence, he dropped out from any further education to join the army in the Indonesian National Revolution. He became the Commander of the Ronggolawe Division in the army, a position which he held throughout the course of the war. After the Dutch retreated from Indonesia in 1949, Sudharmono completed his Secondary Education before going to Jakarta in 1952 to join the Military Law Academy, which he completed the course in 1956. He then served in Medan, North Sumatra, as an Army Attorney from 1957 to 1961. He remained in the army until 1968, and served in the Indonesia–Malaysia confrontation and the Supreme Operations Command (KOTI).

Following the Fall of Sukarno, after the 30 September Movement, and the rise of Suharto, Sudharmono left the army after being named Cabinet Secretary as well as Chairman of the Economic Stability Council by Suharto. In 1970, Sudharmono was moved from the position of Cabinet Secretary to the State Secretary, a position which allowed him to assist Suharto in the day-to-day running of the Government. At the 1983 Golkar National Conference, with Suharto's support, Sudharmono was elected as the Chairman of Golkar. In 1988, during the election of Vice President at the General Assembly of the People's Consultative Assembly (MPR), he was elected as Vice President to accompany Suharto.

As vice president, Sudharmono was extremely active in governing. Despite this however, the military showed their displeasure at Sudharmono's election as vice president, as he represented the civil and bureaucratic wing of Golkar. This culminated in March 1993, during the General Assembly of the MPR, where the army nominated Try Sutrisno as vice president without the consent of Suharto. Although Suharto was likely displeased, Suharto did not want an open conflict with the military deputies and accepted Try as his vice president. Following the end of his term, he published two books, both autobiographies. In May 1998, on the eve of Suharto's fall, Sudharmono, together with former vice presidents Umar Wirahadikusumah, and Try Sutrisno, visited Suharto at his residence to discuss possible options. Sudharmono died on 25 January 2006, after being treated at Metropolitan Medical Center hospital. His body was interred in the Kalibata Heroes Cemetery, Jakarta.

Early life and education 

Sudharmono was born on 12 March 1927, in Cerme village, Gresik, East Java, Dutch East Indies (now Indonesia). His father was Soepijo Wirodiredjo, the son of a carik (secretary) of the Village of Kabalan, in Kanor District, Bojonegoro, who began his career as an intern at the Balen District office. While his mother was Raden Nganten Sukarsi, the daughter of a priyayi from Bojonegoro. He was the third child of four children, having 2 older siblings. An older sister, Mbak Siti, and an older brother, Mas Sunar. When he was 2 years old, his father moved to Tuban, Central Java, to become a clerk at the local government. His mother would die while giving birth to Sudharmono's fourth and youngest sibling. 6 Months later, his father died due to illness, after a few months of being treated in Surabaya. Though before he died, his father had been moved back to Tambakrejo, Bojonegoro.

Following the death of both of his parents, he moved from Surabaya to Jombang. During his time in Jombang, Sudharmono went to live with an uncle, who was a clerk who worked for the local government. He would then move to Wringinanom (in Gresik) and then to Rembang. In Rembang, he lived with his grandmother, Mbah Putri, who was from his mother's side of the family. He began his elementary school education in the  Hollandsch-Inlandsche School (HIS). At HIS, he was accelerated by his teacher from the first grade straight to the third grade. He then continued his education in Semarang, Central Java, where he majored in exact sciences. His education was cut short however with the arrival of the Japanese in 1942.

Military service 

Following the Proclamation of Indonesian Independence, he dropped out from further education to join the army in the Indonesian National Revolution. There, he assisted in collecting weapons from the Japanese troops in preparation of the formation of an Indonesian Army. He would later become the Commander of the Ronggolawe Division, a position which he held throughout the course of the war against the returning Dutch troops. During the war, he took part in the guerilla war against the Dutch around Wonosobo and Magelang. After the Dutch retreated from Indonesia in 1949, Sudharmono completed his Secondary Education before going to Jakarta in 1952 to join the Military Law Academy, which he completed the course in 1956. It was around this time that he befriended then-military officer Leonardus Benjamin Moerdani.

He then served in Medan, North Sumatra, as an Army Attorney from 1957 to 1961. In 1962, Sudharmono received his degree in law after completing a course at Military Law University. After this, Sudharmono was appointed chairman of the Central Government Personnel Orders Unit and provided administrative assistance to the government. During the Indonesia–Malaysia confrontation, President Sukarno formed the Supreme Operations Command (KOTI), which was a war command immediately under Sukarno's control. In 1963, Sudharmono joined KOTI and was given the role of Joint Centre Operations Member for the Supreme Operations.

In October 1965, following the 30 September Movement, Major General Suharto was appointed Army Commander and joined KOTI as the organizations Chief of Staff. Suharto would go on to form a relationship with Sudharmono during these tense times in Indonesian history and it was evident that Sudharmono earned Suharto's trust. On 11 March 1966, when Suharto received the Emergency Powers from Sukarno, Sudharmono was the one who reproduced copies of the letter to be distributed to other military officers. The next day, on 12 March 1966, Sudharmono was also the one to write the decree banning the Indonesian Communist Party (PKI).

State Secretary 

KOTI was disbanded by Suharto in 1968, but Sudharmono, likely due to his administrative skills and the trust that he had earned from Suharto, would become the Cabinet Secretary as well as Chairman of the Economic Stability Council. In 1970, Sudharmono was moved from the position of Cabinet Secretary to the position of State Secretary, a position which allowed him to assist Suharto in the day-to-day running of the Government. Whilst State Secretary, Sudharmono also covered for other ministers when they were unable to perform their duties; with short stints as Interim Information Minister and Interim Home Affairs Minister as well as helping to produce Suharto's accountability speech before the People Consultative Assembly (MPR). In 1980, Sudharmono's position as State Secretary received a significant boost through a presidential decision which gave the State Secretary the power to supervise government purchases exceeding 500 Million Rupiahs.

Chairman of Golkar 

During the 1983 Golkar National Conference, which took place from 20 October until 25 October 1983, Sudharmono was elected as the Chairman of Golkar. His election was unexpected. He was accompanied by Sarwono Kusumaatmadja as secretary general. As Chairman of Golkar, Sudharmono reformed some of the inner workings of the party. He did this by pushing for further transparency within the party organization, created job descriptions for party officials, divided the tasks of party officials, and created the post of field coordinator. Sudharmono also conducted many inspection tours of Golkar branches at the local level to see the implementation and consolidation of Golkar policies.

Sudharmono consolidated Golkars position ahead of the 1987 Indonesian legislative election, focusing its efforts to secure a majority of the popular vote in the devoutly Islamic province of Aceh, which was the only province apart from Jakarta where Golkar had failed to do so in 1982. Golkar made use of two civil servants to run its financial campaign in Aceh, while also using Aceh governor Ibrahim Hasan, an economist who managed to unite the traditional and modern aspirations of the Acehnese people, to their advantage, by making him travel all around the province telling people that a Golkar victory would bring about material development without sacrificing traditional values.

Sudharmono's leadership, as well as the weakness of the Islamic opposition, the United Development Party, following the withdrawal of the Nahdlatul Ulama (NU) from the party, led to Golkar increasing its majority from 242 seats to 299 seats and from 64.34% to 73.11% of the vote. Golkar also achieved its aim in Aceh, and for the first time won an absolute majority of the vote in Jakarta and every other province of Indonesia.

Vice Presidency

Nomination 

As the People's Consultative Assembly (MPR) convened for its 1988 General Session, it was widely believed by many that the aging Suharto would be elected to his fifth and last term as president. As such, the office of Vice Presidenct became a crucial position. Suharto then created a nine person commission to select a name for the vice presidency. Figures in the commission included Akbar Tandjung and Sarwono Kusumaatmadja. Though as 1988 began, Suharto began to show signs that he wanted Sudharmono to become his vice president, although Suharto never mentioned Sudharmono by name. However, the possibility of Sudharmono becoming vice president displeased many in the Armed Forces (ABRI). Although Sudharmono himself was a soldier and had ended his career with the rank of Lieutenant General, he was disliked by many in the military due to the fact that he had spent much of his career behind the desk instead of leading troops on the ground.

Suharto was aware of this and, before the ABRI could do anything, placed ABRI commander Benny Moerdani as Minister of Defense and Security, a position which had no direct line of command to the troops. Replacing him with Try Sutrisno, who had been Suharto's adjutant. When the nomination was finally taken up through the official channels within Golkar, the Bureaucrats and Functional factions unanimously agreed to nominate Sudharmono as vice president. While the ABRI faction's nomination was delayed, with Benny Moerdani continuing to procrastinate by claiming that he had not discussed the vice presidential nomination yet. Rumors that Sudharmono was a communist were spread by ABRI, accusing him of being a member of Pesindo (Pemuda Sosialis Indonesia), a youth socialist organization.

At the General Session itself, which lasted from 1–11 March 1988, controversy continued to dog Sudharmono's nomination as vice president. First, Brigadier General Ibrahim Saleh interrupted the session and launched a scathing attack against Sudharmono before he was taken down from the podium by other MPR members. Then, Sarwo Edhie Wibowo, a general who had helped Suharto get to power in the mid-1960's resigned from both his MPR and People's Representative Council (DPR) seat in protest. Finally, United Development Party Chairman, Jailani Naro nominated himself as vice president, presumably with the private backing in ABRI, who in public supported Sudharmono's nomination; ABRI's support was likely only in opposition to Sudharmono. The chaos of the session resulted in the intervention by Suharto. He cited a decision that the MPR made in 1973 that one of the criteria for a vice president was that he should be able to work with the President. Suharto also conducted discussions with Naro and convinced him to withdraw the nomination. With Naro out of the way, Sudharmono was elected vice president.

Tenure 

As vice president, Sudharmono was reported to be extremely active in governing. He issued a policy to form Tromol Pos 5000 as a means of monitoring the community and he began to consolidate politics by visiting the provinces, departments (ministries), State Offices and other institutions. He also held a Supervision Coordination Meeting annually. Meanwhile, ABRI continued to show their displeasure at Sudharmono's election as vice president. At the Golkar National Conference in 1988, which occurred from 20–25 October 1988, to elect a new chairman, ABRI got their revenge against Sudharmono when they secured the election of Wahono as chairman. The election of Wahono as chairman was the first time in which ABRI demonstrated their political power against Suharto, and resulted in the comeback of ABRI into the Golkar political machine, as the civil and bureaucratic wing of the party (the main supporters of Sudharmono) floundered.

Ahead of the MPR's 1993 General Session, prior to any other maneuver by any other faction within the MPR, ABRI had already made its move. Two weeks prior to the session, chairman of the ABRI faction of Golkar, Harsudiono Hartas, announced that ABRI had nominated Try Sutrisno as vice president. This nomination blindsided Suharto, Sudharmono, and even Try Sutrisno himself, who was not notified of his own nomination. In theory, MPR faction members were allowed to nominate their own candidates for vice president. But in practice, there was an unwritten rule, where factions have to wait for the president to nominate his chosen candidate.

Members from the United Development Party (PPP) and the Indonesian Democratic Party (PDI) quickly approved of Try's nomination, while Golkar struggled in telling its members that Golkar had not nominated Try as Vice President. Suharto was furious that ABRI had pre-empted him, but did not want an open dispute with its delegation in the assembly. This led to an uneasy truce, where Suharto accepted Try as vice president. It has been speculated that, if Try Sutrisno hadn't been nominated, then Suharto would've chosen either Sudharmono or B. J. Habibie as vice president.

Post-vice presidency and death 

Following the end of his term as vice president, Sudharmono returned to private life. In 1997, Sudharmono released his autobiography, Pengalaman Dalam Masa Pengabdian ("Experiences During Time of Service"). Concurrently, a book was also released called Kesan dan Kenangan dari Teman: 70 Tahun H. Sudharmono SH ("Impressions and Memories from Colleagues: 70 Years of Sudharmono"), which talked about Sudharmono from the point of view of those who he had worked with. Due to the close release of his books and the 1998 MPR General session, there were rumors of him planning a political comeback. In May 1998, on the eve of Suharto's fall, Sudharmono, together with former vice presidents Umar Wirahadikusumah, and Try Sutrisno, visited Suharto at his residence to discuss possible options. During the years after the fall of Suharto, he was trusted to coordinate the seven foundations established by the Cendana family, namely Dharmais, Supersemar, Dakap, Damandiri, Amal Bhakti Muslim Pancasila, Gotong Royong, and Trikora.

Sudharmono died on 25 January 2006, at around 19.40 Western Indonesia Time, after undergoing treatment for two weeks at the Intensive Care Unit of the Metropolitan Medical Center (MMC) Hospital, in Jakarta, since 10 January 2006. He died due to lung infection and complications from respiratory failure. He was buried before the Zuhur prayer at around 10:00, the next day, at the Kalibata Heroes Cemetery, Jakarta. Then-president Susilo Bambang Yudhoyono acted as inspector of funeral ceremonies.

Honours

 : 

  Star of the Republic of Indonesia, 2nd Class (29 March 1988)
  Star of Mahaputera, 1st Class (29 March 1988)
  Star of Mahaputera, 2nd Class (10 March 1973)
  Military Distinguished Service Star
  Guerrilla Star
  Star of Jalasena, 2nd Class
  Star of Swa Bhuwana Paksa, 2nd Class
  Star of Kartika Eka Paksi, 3rd Class
  Indonesian Armed Forces "8 Years" Service Star
  Military Long Service Medal, 24 Years Service
  1st Independence War Medal
  2nd Independence War Medal
  Military Operational Service Medal for Madiun 1947
  Military Operational Service Medal for Angkatan Ratu Adil 1947
  "Sapta Marga" Medal
  Military Service Medal for Irian Jaya 1962
  Northern Borneo Military Campaign Medal
  Medal for Combat Against Communists
  Role Model Medal

Possibility as president 

According to historian, author and academic, Robert Elson, in his book Suharto: A Political Biography, Suharto groomed Sudharmono to be his ideal successor. However, the selection of Sudharmono as vice president caused a rift in Golkar, between the civil and military factions. Though Sudharmono himself was a soldier and had ended his career with the rank of Lieutenant General, he was disliked by the military  due to the fact that he had spent much of his career behind the desk instead of leading troops on the ground. This, along with the military's backlash against Sudharmono during the 1988 MPR general session, resulted in Suharto raising B. J. Habibie as his protege, instead of Sudharmono.

Personal life 

Sudharmono married Emma Norma in 1951, and together, they have three children. Sri Adyanti Sudharmono, Sri Aryani Sudharmono, and Tantyo A.P Sudharmono. As of 2021, Tantyo Sudharmono serves as the Chairman of the Indonesian National Council for Social Welfare. Emma Norma outlived Sudharmono by 6 years, dying in 2012, at Pertamina Central Hospital, Jakarta. Her body is also interred at the Kalibata Heroes Cemetery, Jakarta.

See also 

 List of vice presidents of Indonesia

References

Citations

Bibliography 

 Books and journals 

 
 
 
 
 
 
 
 
 
 

 Websites

External links 

 Biodata at tokoh.id  
 Article on ABRI's reluctance to nominate Sudharmono  
 profile on tokoh-indonesia.com 

1927 births
2006 deaths
Vice presidents of Indonesia
People from Gresik Regency
People from Jombang Regency
Deaths from respiratory failure
Indonesian generals
Javanese people
Golkar politicians